Lippmann Hirsch Löwenstein (12 December 1809 – November 1848) was a German Hebrew scholar. He was reviser in the publishing-house of Isaac Lehrberger at Rödelheim, which office was afterward held by Seligman Baer. He was expelled from Frankfurt for revolutionary activities in May 1848.

Publications
  The Book of Proverbs, edited from manuscripts, with a Hebrew commentary and a German metrical translation.
  The Book of Lamentations, with a Hebrew commentary and a German metrical translation, to which he added various kinnot introduced into the liturgy of the Synagogue.
  2nd ed. 1841.
  An ode addressed to Moses Montefiore on his return from the Orient.
 
 
 
  The Pentateuch with Targum Onkelos, Rashi's commentary, and an explanation of the French words used by Rashi.

References
 

1809 births
1848 deaths
19th-century German Jews
German Hebraists
Hebrew–German translators
Jewish German writers
Translators of the Bible into German
Writers from Frankfurt